John Lowe is the CEO of Jeni's Splendid Ice Creams and Eat Well Distribution.

Career 

Lowe began his career at the law firm of Kegler Brown Hill & Ritter in Columbus, Ohio from 1996 to 2005.  He then worked in the legal department at GE Aviation from 2005 to 2009.  In 2009, Jeni Britton Bauer appointed Lowe of Jeni's Splendid Ice Creams.  During his tenure as CEO, Jeni's has grown to 20 scoop shops and is carried by more than 1,800 retailers nationwide.

Lowe is a board member at White Castle, Greater Columbus Sports Commission and Columbus Chamber of Commerce.

Education

Lowe received a bachelor's degree in political science from University of Illinois at Urbana–Champaign in 1995. He then received a law degree from Ohio State University Moritz College of Law in 1998.

References 

Living people
University of Illinois Urbana-Champaign alumni
Ohio State University Moritz College of Law alumni
Year of birth missing (living people)
American chief executives of food industry companies